This is a list of records and statistics of the Africa Cup of Nations.

Debut of national teams
Each successive Africa Cup of Nations has had at least one team appearing for the first time.

Overall team records 
In this ranking 3 points are awarded for a win, 1 for a draw and 0 for a loss. As per statistical convention in football, matches decided in extra time are counted as wins and losses, while matches decided by penalty shoot-outs are counted as draws. Teams are ranked by total points, then by goal difference, then by goals scored.

Medal table

Comprehensive team results by tournament
For each tournament, the number of teams in each finals tournament (in brackets) are shown.

Legend

 – Champions
 – Runners-up
 – Third place
 – Fourth place
QF – Quarter-finals
R16 – Round of 16
GS – Group stage

Q — Qualified for upcoming tournament
 — Qualified but withdrew / Disqualified after qualification
 — Did not qualify
 — Did not enter / Withdrew / Disqualified
 — Hosts
 — Not affiliated to CAF

Results of host nations

Results of defending champions

General statistics by tournament

Records 
Most titles: 7

  

Teams winning on debut: 3

  (1957)
  (1963)
  (1996)

Consecutive title wins: 3

  (2006, 2008, 2010)

Most appearances: 25

 

Most consecutive appearances: 15

  (1994–2021)

Goalscorers

Overall top goalscorers
Players in bold are still active at international level.

Goalscoring records

Landmark goalscorers

Raafat Attia scored the first ever goal at the Africa Cup of Nations; in the first match of the inaugural tournament on 10 February 1957, he got the opening goal for  against hosts  in a 2–1 victory.

Oldest goalscorer

Hossam Hassan was 39 years and 174 days old when he scored for  against  in a 4–1 victory on 3 February 2006.

Youngest goalscorer

Shiva N'Zigou was 16 years and 93 days old when he scored for  against  in a 1–3 defeat on 23 January 2000.

Fastest goals

1st minute, Hassan El-Shazly for  against  in 1974 (2–0 victory).
1st minute, Chérif Fetoui for  against  in 1976 (2–2 draw).
1st minute, Phillip Omondi for  against  in 1978 (3–1 victory).
1st minute, Tueba Menayame for  against  in 1992 (1–1 draw).
1st minute, Ayman Mansour for  against  in 1994 (4–0 victory).
1st minute, Tijani Babangida for  against  in 2000 (2–0 victory).
1st minute, Soufiane Alloudi for  against  in 2008 (5–1 victory).

Latest goal (regulation time)

90+10th minute, Bruno Zita Mbanangoyé for  against  in 2012 (3–2 victory).

Latest goals (including extra time)

120th minute, Brighton Sinyangwe for  against  in 1974 (2–2 draw).
120th minute, Jaouad Zairi for  against  in 2004 (3–1 victory).

Most goals in a single match

Most goals in a single tournament

Most hat-tricks

Hassan El-Shazly scored 2 tournament hat-tricks for the : one in 1963 and one in 1970.

Most tournaments with a goal

Kalusha Bwalya (for ), Samuel Eto'o (for ), Asamoah Gyan and André Ayew (both for ) each scored at least one goal in a record six different tournaments.

Goalscorers in all tournament appearances

The following are all the former international players who scored at least once in all of their tournament appearances (at least three appearances).

Highest goalscorers in a single tournament

The following players finished as top goalscorer with five or more goals in a single tournament.

Top goalscorers in multiple tournaments

The following players finished as the top goalscorer in at least two different tournaments.

Hat-tricks

Appearances

Most tournament appearances
The following players appeared in at least six different AFCON tournaments:

Player records

Oldest player

Youngest player

Most titles won

Coaching

Titles won

Most titles won as coach 

Most consecutive titles won as coach 

Coaches who retained title 

Coaches who won titles with multiple teams 

Won title as both player and coach 

 Mahmoud El-Gohary (in 1959 as a player and 1998 as a manager, both with )
 Stephen Keshi (in 1994 as a player and in 2013 as a manager, both with )

Appearance in final as both player and coach 

 Aliou Cissé (lost 2002 final as a player, lost 2019 final and won 2021 final as a manager, all with )
 Mahmoud El-Gohary (won 1959 final as a player and won 1998 final as a manager, both with )
 Stephen Keshi (lost both 1984 final and 1988 final as a player; and won 2013 final as a manager, all with )

Most nations coached in tournament 

Most tournament appearances as coach 

Titles won by foreign coaches

First foreign coach to win tournament 

Most titles won as foreign coach 

Foreign coaches who also won other major tournaments 

Most titles by coaches from a foreign country 

5 managers,

Most tournaments hosted 

 * Co-hosts
 ** Upcoming tournament

Other team records
 Eight nations have won the tournament as hosts:
  (1959, 1986 and 2006)
  (1963 and 1978)
  (1962)
  (1970)
  (1980)
  (1990)
  (1996)
  (2004)
  became the first ever team to win the Africa Cup of Nations finals in 1957, and also the first team to retain the title in 1959.
  has played the most matches in the tournament finals, with 107.
  has participated in the most tournaments, with 25.
  has the most points from matches played at the tournament finals, with 200.
  is the only team to win three consecutive Africa Cup of Nations finals (in 2006, 2008 and 2010).
  has appeared in the most final matches of the tournament, with ten appearances and seven wins.
  is the team with the most consecutive appearances at the Africa Cup of Nations, with fifteen from 1994 to 2021.
  (as hosts) vs  (as debutantes) on 19 January 2013 was the first opening match of the tournament to end goalless since the inaugural tournament on 10 February 1957.
  has placed on the podium a record fifteen times at the tournament (three gold medals, four silver medals and eight bronze medals).
 In 2017,  set a new record of 24 consecutive Africa Cup of Nations matches played without defeat, dating back to their last tournament appearance in 2010. During this run, Egypt also reached a record nine consecutive wins in AFCON matches after beating  in the 2010 final, while becoming the first team to win three consecutive AFCON titles.

Egypt's run

Consecutive championships
Teams that have won the Africa Cup of Nations consecutively and have become two-time champions (two consecutive titles) or three-time champions (three consecutive titles).

* indicate tournament hosts

Debut of teams in qualification

Teams yet to qualify for finals
Ten teams are yet to qualify for AFCON finals:

References

 
Cup of Nations